Verandah is a census-designated place (CDP) in northeastern Lee County, Florida, United States. It is bordered to the north by Fort Myers Shores, to the northeast by Olga, and to the south by Buckingham.

Verandah was first listed as a CDP prior to the 2020 census.

Demographics

References 

Census-designated places in Lee County, Florida
Census-designated places in Florida